Guido Mancusi (born 14 June 1966) is an Austrian-Italian conductor and composer.

Life 
Born in Portici near Naples, Mancusi was the son of the Neapolitan conductor Enrico Mancusi and the Viennese singing teacher Ines Mancusi and grew up in Naples and Padova. He received his first piano lessons from his father, who was a close friend of the composer Nino Rota. After his father's early death, his mother decided to return to her hometown of Vienna with her two children.

Mancusi became boy soprano with the Vienna Boys' Choir. During his school years he became a member of the Catholic secondary school fraternity K. Ö. St. V. Frankonia zu Wien, to which he still belongs today. Studies followed at the Vienna Academy of Music in composition with Erich Urbanner and conducting with Karl Österreicher, he received diplomas with distinction. In 1992 he became magister artium with a thesis on Paul Hindemith and founded the Baroque Ensemble Vindobona. First engagements led the Kapellmeister to the Landestheater Niederösterreich in St. Pölten and Coburg, to the Raimundtheater and the Theater an der Wien. At the same time, he assisted Ádám Fischer, Riccardo Muti at La Scala and at the Bayreuth Festival. Later followed engagements at the opera houses in Graz and Kiel. He is the winner of the 1991 Mozart Medal for the best Mozart interpretation.

He has conducted at the Wiener Festwochen, the KlangBogen Wien, as well as in England, Argentina, Japan and the USA. He was also guest conductor of the Budapest Concert Orchestra and the Slovak Philharmonic, followed by invitations to Burgos, Tel Aviv, Rome, Stockholm, Helsinki, Montevideo and Moscow, as well as with the Philharmonic Orchestras in Copenhagen, Ljubljana and Toronto. He conducted premieres as a guest at the Wiener Kammeroper, the Schauspielhaus Wien as well as the Stadttheater Klagenfurt, the Wiener Volksoper, at the Theater Erfurt and the Israeli Opera Tel Aviv. He was chief conductor at the Stadttheater Klagenfurt from 2001 to 2007. He was a juror at the "concorso internazionale di canto: Riccardo Zandonai", the world premiere of the oratorio Mother Earth at the Wiener Musikverein and the "National Children's Music Competition" on ORF.

Mancusi is the musical director and conductor of the Volksoper Wien. There he conducted among others the operas The Magic Flute, Hänsel und Gretel, The Adventures of Pinocchio and the operettas Countess Mariza, The Merry Widow, Die Csárdásfürstin, Die Fledermaus, Der Bettelstudent and Meine Schwester und ich. Mancusi also conducted the People's Opera Orchestra in the ballets Carmen, Le Concours, Carmina Burana/Prélude à l'après-midi d'un faune/Boléro and Cendrillon.

In addition to his work as an opera conductor, he is a professor at the Musik und Kunst Privatuniversität der Stadt Wien.

Compositions 
Choral and Orchestral work
 Oratorium: Die Mutter Erde (1990/1991) in Wiener Musikverein
 Missa Brevis (1997)
 Johannespassion (2011)

Chamber music
 Happy Birthday, Quartett,für Prof. Ludwig Streicher zum 70. Geburtstag (1989) Alexander Mayer, in Wiener Musikverein
Orchestral music
 Konzert für Schlagwerk und Kammerorchester (1986) Alexander Mayer, in Wiener Musikverein
Stage work
 One Night Stand, ballet (1995)
 Sachen, ballet (1996)
 Der Traummann, Operette nach Oscar Wilde (2009/10)
 Der Gläserne Birnbaum, Kinderoper (2010)
 In Gottes Namen, Oper (2012/13)
 Über meinen Schwager, später - ossia Kowalski (2016)
Choral music
 Neun Martialische Motetten (1984–2005)
Film music
 Das Inferno der Planeten (1983)
 Invasion der Verdammten (1984)
 I Cranici dell´Ibico (1986)
 Borderline (1987)
 Unternehmen Columbia (1987)
 Leonhard (1988)
Lieder
 Das Kind (1988)
 Acht Liebeslieder (2006)
School music
 7 Kanons über das Einmaleins (1992) Contemp Art, im Wiener Musikverein
Arrangements
 W.A.Mozart:Don Giovanni (2014) Musikhaus Doblinger

References

Further reading 
 Maja Haderlap: Die Ära

Awards 
 1st prize at the International Music Festival - Tokyo
 1st prize at the International Composition Competition Franz Schubert - Vienna
 1st prize Interpretation Prize at the International Composition Competition Franz Schubert
 2nd prize at the International Choir Competition Marktoberdorf in Allgäu

Recording  
 Der Abendhimmel F-Dur, WAB 56, Musik, du himmlisches Gebilde! – CD: ORF CD 73, 1995
 Schubert: Nachtgesang im Walde, CD, Decca Music Group Limited 2017
 Complete Mozart edition, Arias, Lieder, Notturni, Decca Music Group Limited CD 2000
 From Vienna with Love, Conchita Wurst, Wiener Symphoniker, Sony, 2018

External links 
 
 
 Stadttheater Klagenfurt
 Volksoper Wien
 Musikhaus Döblinger Musikalienhandlung
 

Austrian conductors (music)
Austrian composers
20th-century classical composers
20th-century hymnwriters
Austrian film score composers
Italian male film score composers
1966 births
Living people
People from Portici